The Phillip Burton Federal Building & United States Courthouse is a massive 21 floor,  federal office building located at 450 Golden Gate Avenue near San Francisco's Civic Center and the San Francisco City Hall. The building occupies an entire city block, bounded by Golden Gate Avenue at the south, Turk Street at the north, Polk Street at the west, and Larkin Street at the east.

Designed by the local architectural firm of John Carl Warnecke and Associates in the International Style, construction was completed in 1964.

It serves as one of four courthouses for the United States District Court for the Northern District of California. The building was finished in 1964, one of the earliest office towers for San Francisco. It is named for former U.S. Representative Phillip Burton.

Occupants
Cafe 450 – 2nd Fl.

Federal Bureau of Investigation San Francisco Field Office – 13th Fl.

Federal Public Defender – 19th Fl.

Internal Revenue Service Help Center – 1st Fl.

U.S. Army Corps of Engineers

U.S. Attorney's Office – 11th and 9th Fl.

U.S. Department of Justice Antitrust Division – 10th Fl.

U.S. District Court for the Northern District of California

U.S. Marshals Service – 20th Fl.

San Francisco Passport Agency – 3rd Fl.

U.S. Pretrial Services – 18th Fl.

U.S. Probation – 17th Fl.

See also
List of tallest buildings in San Francisco

References

Civic Center, San Francisco
Skyscraper office buildings in San Francisco
Government buildings completed in 1959
Leadership in Energy and Environmental Design certified buildings